The Naval Air Force is an armed service of the Vietnam People's Navy that has the function of performing tasks at sea or along the coast and islands by means of the air force such as aircraft combat aircraft, transport helicopters and patrol aircraft, etc. This is a force of the Navy that can coordinate missions with the Vietnam People's Air Force and many situations with similar functions, but the Naval Air Force is still a separate branch of the Vietnam People's Navy.

The traditional military day is July 24 (the establishment of the Naval Air Defense - Air Force).

Date of establishment of the first official unit: 3 July (the date the 954th Naval Aviation Brigade was returned to the Navy by the Air Force).

Formation 
Although the Navy branch of the People's Army of Vietnam was established in 1955 after the end of the Indochina War, but due to the situation and conditions at that time especially the Vietnam War broke out, the United States Naval Air Forces constantly raiding northern Vietnam, so the Navy at that time did not have its own naval aviation.

After the Vietnam War ended, the Vietnam People's Navy gradually regularized and established many new forces and branches following the model of the Soviet Navy, including the naval aviation. On July 24, 1986, the Navy Commander issued Decision No. 1253/B0-31 on the establishment of the Air Defense - Air Force Department on the basis of merging the Naval Air Defense Department and the Naval Air Force Department.

After forming, Vietnamese naval soldiers were selected to go to the Soviet Union to train in the use of new weapons of the armed services. In the second half of the 1980s, the Vietnam Naval Aviation received 12 Soviet Kamov Ka-25 submarine-hunting helicopters.

Also in the second half of the 1980s, the Vietnam Naval Aviation continued to receive 4 Beriev Be-12 submarine-hunting seaplanes. The Be-12 squadron and the Sukhoi Su-22 of the Vietnam People's Air Force often organize patrols in the Spratly Islands.

Later, Vietnam received new Kamov Ka-27PL anti-submarine helicopters from the Soviet Union. After 1991, the Soviet Union disintegrated, Vietnam no longer received aid but continued to receive modern Kamov Ka-28 anti-submarine helicopters through purchase from Russia. Currently, Kamov Ka-28 is the main anti-submarine weapon of the Naval Aviation force. In addition, Vietnam also purchased 10 Kamov Ka-32T helicopters designed similar to Ka-25/28 but for transport and rescue purposes.

After the United States Department of State withdrew the ban on exporting military helicopters to Vietnam through the long-term lobbying of the Executive Decision Export Services Group, the Ministry of Defence of Vietnam purchased many helicopters operating in Vietnam sea of Eurocopter (France) to equip the armed service. In 2011, the Vietnam People's Navy just received a fleet of Eurocopter EC225 Super Puma transport-reconnaissance helicopters for the navy.

On August 17, 2012, the Navy held a groundbreaking ceremony for the construction of the Naval Aviation Regiment infrastructure project at Cam Ranh Airport, Khánh Hoà Province.

In 2010, the Vietnamese Ministry of Defense ordered six De Havilland Canada DHC-6 Twin Otter maritime patrol aircraft from Canada. The Navy has decided to send 12 pilots of DHC-6 aircraft to Canada to train for a period of 17 months, in order to enhance the ability to patrol at sea.

On July 3, at the 372nd Airborne Division (Đoàn Hải Vân), the Ministry of Defense held a ceremony to hand over the 954th Airborne Brigade (formerly known as the 954th Helicopter Regiment) from the Vietnam People's Air Force to the Navy and announced the decision to establish the 930th Helicopter Regiment stationed at Da Nang International Airport, under 372nd Division (Vietnam People's Air Force). The 930th Regiment was established to replace the 954th Regiment transferred to the People's Navy. The regiment has the duty of observation flight; reconnaissance, indicating targets in the air, on the ground and on the water surface; in charge of military transport in the central region - the Central Highlands and the southern Gulf of Tonkin; fly special aircraft to serve the Communist Party of Vietnam, State and Army leaders; participate in search, rescue, rescue and prevention of floods and storms; ready to perform the task of cooperating in combat to provide air fire support to the armed forces when ordered; organize conversion flight training for students of helicopter pilots of the Air Force Officer's College.

Based on its basic functions and current capabilities, the 954th Naval Air Brigade can perform the following tasks: Submarine hunting; military transport; reconnaissance, observation in the air, on the ground, on the water; search and rescue at sea, on land and rescue and prevention of storms and floods.

Current equipment 
Current weapons of the Vietnam Naval Aviation:

  Kamov Ka-28 anti-submarine helicopters: 7-10 units.
  Kamov Ka-32 rescue helicopter: 1 unit
  Eurocopter AS365 Dauphin rescue helicopter: 6 units
  Aérospatiale SA 330 Puma transport/rescue helicopter: 9 units
  Eurocopter AS332 Super Puma transport helicopter: 7 units.
  Eurocopter EC225 Super Puma marine reconnaissance helicopter: 2-4 units
  De Havilland Canada DHC-6 Twin Otter maritime patrol aircraft: 6 units (delivered in 2013–2014)

The Kamov Ka-25 and Beriev Be-12 squadrons were decommissioned due to their aging.

The Vietnam People's Navy is planning to order from the United States 6 Lockheed P-3 Orion patrol aircraft of the United States Navy and the two sides are continuing to negotiate. The United States government can help the Vietnamese side complete this contract. It is expected that these 6 P-3Cs will be upgraded with the most modern radio-electronic equipment (FLIR infrared target search sensor, ASQ-114 computer system, AYA-8 data, MAD ASQ-81 display system, ALR-95V radar, AQH-4V hydroacoustic navigation system) in the United States before returning to Vietnam if the contract is performed.

P-3C Orion is a maritime reconnaissance, anti-submarine warfare (MPA) patrol aircraft, its appearance in the South China Sea can create a geopolitical and geo-military change in the region. If Vietnam's plan to buy 6 P-3 anti-submarine aircraft becomes reality, they will be commissioned for the Naval Aviation and the P-3C will significantly increase its anti-submarine capabilities and protect the territorial waters of the country Vietnam, serving the requirements of building a regular, elite and gradually modern People's Army of Vietnam force.

Uniforms 
Airmen of the Navy wear the style and color of the Navy uniform. Wear the Navy purple combination military rank, with the air force insignia. Wear a purple hard hat and soft hat.

Notes

See also 

 Vietnam People's Air Force

Vietnam People's Navy